Montpelier Roxbury Public Schools is a K-12 school district in Montpelier, Vermont, USA which serves as the governing body of Union Elementary School, Roxbury Village School, Main Street Middle School, and Montpelier High School.  Its business office is located in Montpelier High School.  Its serves students in some towns such as Calais, Adamant, Berlin, and East Montpelier, offering Main Street Middle School and Montpelier High School as an alternative to U-32 Junior/Senior High School.

History
Montpelier High School was created as a successor to the Washington County Grammar School, incorporated in 1813.  MHS first issued diplomas in 1914, the year a new high school building opened on Main Street. That building was replaced by the current building, off Bailey Avenue, which opened in 1956. As Montpelier Public Schools began to adopt the new middle school model, the old high school building was converted into Main Street Middle School, and continues to house grades 6, 7, and 8. The present high school building was enlarged in 1998. In 2015, the 5th Grade in Montpelier Public Schools was moved from Union Elementary School to Main Street Middle School.

Budget
In 2014, the Montpelier School Board approved a budget of $17.8 million for FY 15.  This is an increase from $17.4 million in FY 14.

References

Education in Washington County, Vermont